EXT3 can refer to:
 The ext3 journaling filesystem for Linux
 EXT3 (gene)